Françoise Dumas (born 12 April 1960) is a French politician of La République En Marche! (LREM) and of Territories of Progress (TDP) who has been a member of the National Assembly of France since 2012, representing Gard's 1st constituency since 2012. She was previously a member of the Socialist Party.

Political career
In parliament, Dumas serves as member of the National Defence and Armed Forces Committee; since 2019, she has been the committee's chairwoman. She is also a member of the Committee on European Affairs.

In addition to her committee assignments, Dumas is part of the parliamentary friendship groups with Cameroon, Gabon and Peru.

Political positions
In July 2019, Dumas voted in favor of the French ratification of the European Union’s Comprehensive Economic and Trade Agreement (CETA) with Canada.

References

1960 births
Living people
People from Gard
Socialist Party (France) politicians
La République En Marche! politicians
Territories of Progress politicians
Deputies of the 14th National Assembly of the French Fifth Republic
Deputies of the 15th National Assembly of the French Fifth Republic
Women members of the National Assembly (France)
21st-century French women politicians